Joshua M. Braaten (born June 25, 1977) is an American actor.

Early life and education
Born in Austin, Minnesota, Braaten grew up in Blooming Prairie, Minnesota, and graduated from Blooming Prairie High School in 1995. He graduated in 1999 from Winona State University, where he performed on stage in a production of Shakespeare's Macbeth, playing the title character.

Career
Braaten has appeared in the TV shows CSI: Miami, This is Us, That 80's Show, Spin City, American Horror Story: Hotel, Boston Legal, Psych, The Ex List, Criminal Minds, and The Mentalist. He has also appeared in the films Dumb and Dumberer: When Harry Met Lloyd, The Frequency of Claire, and Big Shot: Confessions of a Campus Bookie. He played of the role the Flint Tropics player, Twiggy Munson in the 2008 film Semi-Pro and the role of Derek in the film Overnight. He played the role of Andy in "Katie," the second episode of the second season of New Girl. Also played the role of David in season three, episode 22: "School Recital" of Mike & Molly

Braaten is also a stage actor, performing at The Mark Taper Forum and North Coast Rep. He is a frequent contributor to "Bumper to Bumper with Dan Barreiro" on KFAN in the Twin Cities.

Filmography

Film

Television

External links

1977 births
Living people
Male actors from Minnesota
People from Austin, Minnesota
People from Blooming Prairie, Minnesota
American male television actors
Winona State University alumni
American male film actors
21st-century American male actors